Philip C. Kendall (born March 2, 1950) is Distinguished University Professor and Laura H. Carnell Professor of Psychology, Director of the Child and Adolescent Anxiety Disorders Clinic at Temple University, and clinical child and adolescent psychologist. Alongside contemporaries at Temple University, Kendall produced the Coping Cat program. Coping Cat is an evidence-based and empirically supported treatment for anxiety in youth.

Early life and education 
Kendall is a Merrick, New York native. Following his graduation from Chaminade High School. he went on to Old Dominion University where he received his bachelor's degree in 1972. A few years later, Kendall graduated from Virginia Commonwealth University in 1977 with a clinical psychology doctorate. While at VCU, Kendall did work on clinical child and adolescent psychology. Kendall received the Outstanding Alumnus Award from both of these universities.

Professional roles and awards 
During his University of Minnesota tenure, Kendall was promoted to Full Professor and appointed the title of Director of Clinical Training. Afterwards, Kendall entered Temple University as faculty where he has spent the rest of his academic career. He's been the President of the Society of Clinical Child and Adolescent Psychology (Division 53) of APA in addition to being President of the Association for the Advancement of Behavior Therapy(AABT, now ABCT).

Kendall received some notable awards including tristate area's “Top therapist” award by Philadelphia Magazine in 1997.

Impact 
Over 750 papers have been published by Kendall and he has authored 35 books and treatment manuals. His research has been backed by continuous funding from outside organizations (NIMH; NICHD; MacArthur Foundation) for three decades. He is cited by more than a few. In 2006, Kendall ranked 5th for number of publications and citations among all members of APA-approved programs.

Kendall designed the Coping Cat program, a set of treatment courses for children and adolescents who suffer from anxiety disorders. His treatment courses have been recognized as being supported in empirical ways being implemented 15 plus countries, and have been incorporated globally in several initiatives that were federally-funded research based and were involved in treatment and prevention.

References

External links

People from Merrick, New York
1950 births
Living people
Virginia Commonwealth University alumni
21st-century American psychologists
Temple University faculty
University of Minnesota faculty
Old Dominion University alumni
20th-century American psychologists